KKGO (105.1 FM, "Go Country 105") is a commercial radio station that is licensed to Los Angeles, California, United States and serves the Greater Los Angeles area. The station is owned by Mount Wilson FM Broadcasters and airs a country music format. The KKGO studios are located in Los Angeles' Westwood neighborhood, while the station transmitter resides on Mount Wilson. Besides a standard analog transmission, KKGO broadcasts over four HD Radio channels and is available online.

KKGO is notable in being the lone remaining full-power commercial FM signal licensed to Los Angeles, and one of a very few remaining nationwide, that is still independently owned and operated.

History

Jazz (1959-1989) 
Saul Levine launched the station at 105.1 FM in February 1959 as KBCA, one of the first FM stations to broadcast from Mount Wilson. In 1979, the station changed its call sign to KKGO. This was prompted by a court challenge from KABC, according to one local podcaster. In 1988 the call sign was modified to KKGO-FM. A traditional jazz music format was aired until 1989.

Classical (1989-2007) 
After Evergreen Media's record-setting purchase of KFAC-FM (92.3 FM) on January 15, 1989, followed by rumors and publicity stunts suggesting that station would abandon its long-running fine arts/classical music format (one which had its roots in KFAC (1330 AM), itself divested prior to Evergreen's purchase of the FM), KKGO announced that it would flip to classical effective January 1, 1990, with the jazz format being transferred to 540 AM.

Mount Wilson FM Broadcasters chairman Saul Levine made an initial bid for KFAC's music library, one which dated back to the 1940s, but withdrew his bid when presented with an asking price upwards of $1 million; a combination of KUSC, the Los Angeles Public Library, and Stanford University acquired it instead. In the time between KFAC-FM's switch on September 20, 1989 and KKGO's switch the following January 1, KKGO offered classical programming for part of the day, with former KFAC host John Santana hired as a part-time announcer.

KKGO celebrated the complete conversion to classical by playing selections from Franz Lehár's operetta The Land of Smiles. Another KFAC programming staple would be revived on KKGO that March: the Gas Company Evening Concert, which ran on KFAC and KFAC-FM between 1940 and 1989; former KFAC announcer Tom Dixon was hired as host of the new program's incarnation.

In 2000, the call letters were changed to KMZT-FM  to reflect on their rebranding as "K-Mozart". The KKGO call letters were then moved to the co-owned station at 1260 AM.

Country (2007-present) 
When longtime country music station KZLA (93.9 FM) flipped formats in August 2006, it left the two largest media markets in the United States and three of the top four without a full-time country music station. The New York City market had been without a country station following the format change of WYNY and three repeaters in 2003, while the San Francisco Bay Area was without one following KZBR's 2005 format change. The other top-three market, Chicago, is served by WUSN.

On February 26, 2007 at 5:00 a.m., in a surprise move announced only three days earlier, Mount Wilson Broadcasters flipped KKGO from K-Mozart to country as "Go Country 105". The company cited declining advertising revenues for the classical format. Saul Levine swapped the formats of 105.1 FM with 1260 AM, bringing the country format and the KKGO calls back to FM while moving the classical programming and the KMZT calls to the AM signal. (XESURF-AM continued to play country music, first simulcasting KKGO's format, but later splitting its programming from that of KKGO). After playing Mozart's "String Quartet no. 23 in F major, K. 590", Los Angeles was left once again without a commercial analog FM classical music station.

KKGO brought country music back to the FM dial after a six-month absence, much to the delight of Southern California country fans who had spent that time petitioning the radio community to restore country radio in Los Angeles. Such activity included writing letters, making phone calls, wearing "I Want My Country Music Back" shirts, and distributing ribbons reading "Save Country Music". Their goal was to assure broadcasters and others that the country music format would be a valuable asset to a local radio station. The first song on Go Country 105 was "Only in America" by Brooks & Dunn.

K-Mozart returned to KKGO on April 4, 2011, this time on the HD2 subchannel. As of March 2017, K-Mozart is heard on KKGO-HD4 while KKGO-HD2 airs an oldies format.

On May 8, 2013, KKGO began limiting access to the online stream of Go Country 105 to listeners in California due to rising royalty rates from the exponential growth of the streaming audience. KKGO's sister stations and HD subchannels did not restrict their respective streams. As of 2015, this restriction has been lifted; access to the stream is available throughout the United States via the KKGO website as well as through iHeartRadio.

Until 2015, KKGO was simulcast on KGIL in Johannesburg, California, extending Go Country 105's reach into the Mojave Desert. The simulcast ended after Mount Wilson's sale of KGIL to Adelman Broadcasting closed.

In addition to its K-Mozart AM sister stations, KKGO also had an AM radio station on 540 AM.

Christmas music
On November 15, 2016, KKGO began its annual tradition of airing Christmas music around the clock in November and December, rebranding itself as "105.1 Your Christmas Destination". With this move, the station competes directly with KOST, which also switches to a 24/7 Christmas format. During this time, KKGO's regular, non-seasonal country music remains available on their HD channels and online. Although the station is formatted as a country music station year-round, KKGO plays Christmas songs from both country and non-country artists. The station reverted to its basic country format on December 26, 2016. It has continued switching to Christmas music every November–December 26 since. KKGO often has notable music figures host Christmas programming, past guests have included Dan + Shay, Chris Young, Mitchell Tenpenny, Carrie Underwood, Idina Menzel, and Martina McBride.

HD Radio
KKGO began broadcasting an HD Radio digital signal in 2005. As of 2023, KKGO broadcasts on four subchannels:
KKGO-HD1 is a digital simulcast of the analog signal.
KKGO-HD2 carries a classical music format branded "K-Mozart" as a simulcast of KMZT 1260 AM.
KKGO-HD3 airs an adult standards format branded "Unforgettable FM"
KKGO-HD4 broadcasts an oldies format branded "L.A. Oldies K-SURF".

Unforgettable
In 2005, Mount Wilson Broadcasting started simulcasting the programming of its two AM stations at the time, KKGO in Beverly Hills, California and XESURF-AM in the Tijuana—San Diego border area, on KKGO's HD2 signal, hosting an adult standards format known as "Unforgettable 540 & 1260". While the AM signals combine to cover much of the Southern California region, they were still weak, especially at night in Orange County; the FM HD2 simulcast helped boost the reach of the format.

In March 2015, the HD3 subchannel began airing Unforgettable, flipping from classic country. Songs representative of this adult standards format, collectively referred to as the "Great American Songbook", come from such artists as Nat King Cole, Barbra Streisand, Harry Connick, Jr., Tony Bennett, Mel Tormé, Rosemary Clooney, Dean Martin, Andy Williams, Frank Sinatra, and Michael Bublé. This took the subchannel back to a format similar to the one it aired a few years prior under the banner of "Retro 105". However, Retro 105 was only heard in Los Angeles whereas Unforgettable was classified as syndicated and was heard on KNRY in Monterey, California as well. Later, Unforgettable moved to KKGO's HD4 subchannel. Unforgettable would be dropped altogether, but brought back later.

References

General references
Countryboards.com — Country music message board set up as a command center for fans to get country music back on FM radio after losing KZLA

External links

FCC History Cards for KKGO (covering 1956-1981 as KDBX / KBCA / KGGO)

Country radio stations in the United States
KGO
Radio stations established in 1959